Helena Hietanen (born 1963) is a Finnish artist who lives and works in Helsinki. She studied at the University of Art and Design Helsinki. Her work often uses optical fiber in the construction of textiles. She is married to fellow artist Jaakko Niemelä, with whom she has repeatedly exhibited.

Exhibitions 
 Galerie Anhava, Helsinki, Finland 1996
 Illuminazione, The Venice Biennale, Venice, Italy 1997
 Helsinki – Arsenal, Kunsthalle, Riga, Latvia 1997
 Ume.Se, Umeå, Sweden 1998
 The Czech Museum of Fine Arts, Prague, Czech Republic 1999
 Les Champs de la Sculpture 2000, Paris, France 1999
 Internationale Kunstmesse, Berlin, Germany 2000

References

External links
 Technolace exhibition

1963 births
Living people
20th-century Finnish sculptors
20th-century Finnish women artists
21st-century Finnish sculptors
21st-century Finnish women artists